Upper Norrland is a National Area of Sweden. The National Areas are a part of the NUTS statistical regions of Sweden.

Geography
Övre Norrland is the northernmost region of Sweden and forms part of Sápmi (Lapland).  It is the Sweden's largest region by area. It borders Norway, Finland, and the riksområde of Middle Norrland.

The most populous cities are Umeå, Luleå, Skellefteå, Piteå and Boden.

Subdivision
Upper Norrland includes 2 counties: 
 Norrbotten (seat: Luleå)
 Västerbotten (seat: Umeå)

Economy 
The Gross domestic product (GDP) of the region was 27.911 billion € in 2021, accounting for 4.9% of Swedish economic output. GDP per capita adjusted for purchasing power was 35,100 € or 116% of the EU27 average in the same year. The GDP per employee was 109% of the EU average.

See also 
Sápmi
Norrland
Riksområden
NUTS of Sweden
ISO 3166-2:SE
Local administrative unit
Subdivisions of Norden

References

External links

 
National Areas of Sweden
Norrland
NUTS 2 statistical regions of the European Union